Yassamin Maleknasr (also spelled Yasman Malek-Nasr, born 19 May 1955, Tehran, Iran) is an Iranian filmmaker and actress.

Career
Yassamin Maleknasr is the first Iranian woman filmmaker to graduate from the University of Southern California (USC) in Film and Television Production. She did post-graduate work in Drama at Towson State University in Maryland.

She made her first short film, Jazz Ballet in the U.S.; then after several years working at American film companies, she returned to Tehran to perform in Dariush Mehrjui's film Sara (1993) for which she won a "Best Supporting Actress" award from the Fajr International Film Festival in Tehran. She has also acted in a number of other Iranian features.

In 1995, Maleknasr directed and acted in her first feature film, "Common Plight".

In 2002, she took a journey with a small crew throughout war-torn Afghanistan and traveled more than 3,000 miles by land to make her acclaimed film, “Afghanistan the Lost Truth”. Her recent lyrical documentary, "Women of the Silk Road", depicts the lives of four women from four countries of the Silk Road is an exploration of women’s lives today via textile along the ancient trade route. Shot in Iran, Turkey, Oman, and Tajikistan. A story of love, courage, and hope.

Her films have been screened at various networks such as Arte, France and Ireland, BBC, Australian, and New Zealand networks, TVC Spain, USHUAIA France, plus special screenings at the Screen Actors Guild – Los Angeles, United Nations – New York, World Bank – Washington DC, the United States Senate, and many universities across the United States.

See also 
 Iranian cinema
 List of famous Persian women

References

External links

Living people
1955 births
People from Tehran
Actresses from Tehran
Iranian film directors
Iranian film actresses
Towson University alumni
Women documentary filmmakers
Iranian women film directors
Iranian documentary filmmakers
USC School of Cinematic Arts alumni
Crystal Simorgh for Best Supporting Actress winners